The Louisiana Department of Wildlife & Fisheries – Enforcement Division (LDWF) is the fish & game regulatory agency of Louisiana.  It has jurisdiction anywhere in the state, and in state territorial waters.  The agency enforces both state and federal laws dealing with hunting, fishing, and boating safety.  The agency also enforces criminal laws in rural areas including DWI enforcement both on highways and waterways.  Most of the Department's Wildlife Agents also carry Federal law enforcement commissions issued from the United States Department of the Interior - U.S. Fish and Wildlife Service, and United States Department of Commerce - U.S. National Marine Fisheries Service (NMFS).  These federal commissions allow these state officers to enforce federal migratory waterfowl laws and federal marine fisheries laws in state and federal waters off the coast of Louisiana.  Besides their traditional role as a "game warden", Louisiana Wildlife Enforcement Agents also have a number of other responsibilities, including conducting board of health inspections on some portions of the state's commercial fishing industry.  Agents are trained in and conduct numerous search and rescue operations, both in remote land areas and on the state's waterways.  Agents ensure that hunters, anglers, boaters, dealers, breeders, farmers, and transporters are in compliance with regulations governing equipment, quotas, licenses, and registrations.  Agents also assist other State departments and law enforcement agencies in the coordination of educational and professional endeavors, as well as national and state emergency alerts by the Federal Office of Emergency Preparedness.  In addition, agents perform search and rescue missions alone or in conjunction with other local, state, and federal agencies.

History

Louisiana's first wildlife conservation law was passed in 1857.  The agency started out in 1872 as an Oyster Fishing Regulatory Board, with many more oyster regulations following in the 1880s.  In 1909 a more formal body was created and given the task of overseeing wildlife and fisheries conservation in Louisiana.  It was at that time called the Louisiana Board of Commissioners for the Protection of Birds, Game and Fish.  In 1910, the Louisiana Oyster Commission (which had been created in 1902) merged with the Board of Commissioners to create the Louisiana Department of Conservation.  In 1912, the Conservation Commission of Louisiana was formed as a department of State government, with the mission of providing for the protection of birds, fish, shellfish, wild quadrupeds, forestry and mineral resources of the state. In 1918 the name of the agency changed back to the Department of Conservation, and directed that it be controlled by an officer known as the Commissioner of Conservation, who would be appointed by the Governor, by and with the consent of the Senate, for a term of four years.  In 1944, the Louisiana Department of Wild Life and Fisheries was officially created.  In 1952, the agency's name was changed to the name Louisiana Wild Life and Fisheries Commission.  The current Louisiana Department of Wildlife & Fisheries was created in 1975.  The Enforcement Division eventually took over regulation of all hunting, fishing, and boating in the state of Louisiana.  The agency employs over 200 Wildlife Agents.  In 2005, the Enforcement Division was involved in extensive search and rescue missions in the New Orleans area following Hurricane Katrina.  One of the Department's Agents, Sgt. Rachel Zechenelly, was named as one of Glamour Magazine's "2005 Women of the Year" for her role in rescue efforts

Patrol areas

The department is divided up into eight regions, with its headquarters in Baton Rouge.  Each Region is divided into two or more districts.  The Regions are divided as follows:

 Region 1 (Minden): covers the following Parishes (Counties): Bossier, Caddo, Desoto, Bienville, Clairborne, Red River, Webster
 Region 2 (Monroe): covers the Parishes of: Jackson, Lincoln, Ouachita, Union, Morehouse, East Carroll, West Carroll, Richland, Caldwell, Franklin, Madison,  Tensas
 Region 3 (Pineville): covers the Parishes of Winn, Grant, Rapides, Avoyelles,  Natchitoches, Sabine, Vernon, Lasalle, Concordia, Catahoula.
 Region 4 (Opelousas): covers the Parishes of St. Landry, Pointe Coupee, Lafayette, West Baton Rouge, St. Martin (upper half), Iberville, and Iberia.  This was the old Region 6.
 Region 5 (Lake Charles): covers the Parishes of Allen, Beauregard, Evangeline, Calcasieu, Cameron, Acadia, Jefferson Davis, Vermillion
Region 6 (Thibodaux): covers the Parishes of Assumption, St. James, St. John the Baptist, St. Mary, St. Martin (lower half), and Lafourche,  Terrebonne,  Jefferson (Grand Isle area).  This was the old Region 9.
 Region 7 (Baton Rouge): covers the Parishes of East Feliciana, West Feliciana, East Baton Rouge, Ascension, Tangipahoa, Livingston, St. Helena, St. Tammany and Washington.
 Region 8 (New Orleans): covers the Parishes of Jefferson, Orleans, St. Charles, Plaquemines and St. Bernard

In 2010, the old Region 4 office located in Ferriday was disbanded.  The parishes under its control were divided between Region 2 and Region 3, and redistributed as shown above.  The Region offices numbers were also redistributed, mainly affecting the redesignation of the Opelousas and Thibodaux offices.  The old Region 4 covered the following parishes: Lasalle, Concordia, Catahoula, Caldwell, Franklin, Madison, and Tensas.

Rank structure

The Louisiana Department of Wildlife & Fisheries Enforcement Division rank structure is as listed:

Duty weapons
The current standard issue firearm for wildlife enforcement agents is the SIG Sauer semi-automatic pistol in .45 ACP.  Each agent is also issued a Remington 870 Police 12 gauge shotgun.  Agents are also issued (since Hurricane Katrina) SIG SG 551 carbines chambered for .223 Remington.  These agents also come equipped with collapsible batons and pepper spray.

Patrol vehicles
Louisiana Wildlife agents patrol in a wide variety of vehicles.  The main patrol vehicles are four-wheel-drive pick-up trucks made by Ford, Dodge, or General Motors.  The  Ford Crown Victoria "Police Interceptor."  is also used in some roles.  A wide variety of watercraft are employed by the agency, most notably the Boston Whaler.  Several different manufacturers' 4-wheeler ATVs are also used.  The Enforcement Division also utilizes several single engine fixed winged aircraft, as well as several large offshore patrol boats.

Special units
Like many other police agencies around the United States, LDWF has several sub-divisions in specialized tasks.  LDWF/LED contains four specialized units with selected missions or purposes: the Special Operations Section; the Statewide Strike Force; the Maritime Special Response Team; and the Aviation Section. Agents in specialized units have developed specific skills, expertise and knowledge appropriate for their particular operational fields. Agents in specialized units operate in relatively broad geographic areas and may work alongside regional enforcement agents when appropriate.

The Special Operations Section houses covert operations in which undercover agents work to stem the illegal sale of fish and wildlife, develop information about ongoing criminal enterprises, and address major violations of state and federal law.

The Statewide Strike Force is assigned to work problem areas statewide. They devote attention to commercial fisheries operations and license fraud. Violations include smuggling, 
interstate commerce violations and false reporting, and under-reporting of commercial fish harvests. These agents provide regions with additional manpower on WMAs and places of high seasonal utilization, such as Grand Isle and other locations throughout the state. Strike Force agents also assist regional agents with oyster harvest enforcement, which primarily addresses harvesting oysters in closed waters, stealing from oyster leases and state grounds, and oyster size regulations.

The Maritime Special Response Team cooperative endeavor by the LDWF Enforcement Division and the Louisiana State Police SWAT team addresses maritime security threats within the state of Louisiana. The team provides a maritime tactical response capability at the state level in order to effectively provide public safety, officer safety, CBRNE prevention, and response and tactical support for LDWF's federal, state and local partners.

The Aviation Section contains two pilots and three airplanes. The Aviation Section's aircraft provide a valuable platform for detecting illegal hunting and fishing activities and frequently play a vital life-saving role in search and rescue operations. The Aviation Section also contributes its services to other divisions for biological missions, such as waterfowl counts and the monitoring of commercial fisheries.

Fallen officers

Since its formation, 11 Louisiana Department of Wildlife and Fisheries agents have been killed in the line of duty.

See also

List of law enforcement agencies in Louisiana
Louisiana Wildlife Agents Association
Louisiana State Police
Louisiana State Troopers Association
Game warden

References

External links
LDWF website

https://www.youtube.com/watch?v=gLA1umZmeck
https://www.youtube.com/watch?v=P0JLdbRTNOU
https://www.youtube.com/watch?v=YHzliKSxFEo
https://www.youtube.com/watch?v=67mNWH_m60Y

State law enforcement agencies of Louisiana
Specialist police departments of Louisiana
Maritime law enforcement agencies of the United States